Alexander Curt Brade (1881–1971), German-Brazilian botanist
Reginald Brade (1864–1933), British civil servant
William Brade (1560–1630), English composer, violinist, and viol player

See also
Brades, a village in Montserrat